Smoketown School was a historic one-room school located near Martinsburg, Berkeley County, West Virginia. It was built in 1869, and is a one-story, brick building in a vernacular Greek Revival style.  It was used as a school until 1940, and the property was later sold to the Greensburg United Methodist Church.

It was listed on the National Register of Historic Places in 1994.

The building was condemned in June 2012 and razed the next month.

References

Defunct schools in West Virginia
Educational institutions disestablished in 1940
Former school buildings in the United States
Greek Revival architecture in West Virginia
National Register of Historic Places in Berkeley County, West Virginia
One-room schoolhouses in West Virginia
School buildings completed in 1869
Schools in Berkeley County, West Virginia
School buildings on the National Register of Historic Places in West Virginia
1869 establishments in West Virginia